JK Enum Nanbanin Vaazhkai is a 2015 Indian Tamil-language romantic drama film written and directed by Cheran, which was simultaneously made and later released in Telugu as Rajadhi Raja. It stars Sharwanand and Nithya Menen while Prakash Raj and Santhanam play supporting roles. The film featured songs by G. V. Prakash Kumar and film scored by Siddharth Vipin. After failing to have a theatrical release in late 2013, the Tamil version of the film had a direct-to-video release in March 2015, becoming the first venture in a new initiative launched by Cheran known as Cinema2Home (C2H). The Telugu version of the film had been indefinitely placed on hold, but was later released theatrically in June 2016, with the makers trying to profit from Sharwanand's popularity.

Plot 

Jayakumar (Sharwanand), commonly known as JK, is a mid-20s man who does not care about family. Instead, he is obsessed with chatting on Facebook, partying, and passing time with friends. At work, he has a group of friends with similar interests. They all plan on going for a New Year Party.

Two years later, JK is shown to be a changed person – very invested in developing, earning money and taking care of his family. He is shown to make business models with an aim of earning a lot of money in a short period of time. He has goals such as getting his two sisters married and ensuring that his brother gets good education. In attempts to start business, he goes to meet a bank manager at his home. As they had to wait for the bank manager to come, JK and his friend notice that the house is not well-maintained and take on the job to organise it. Upon returning, bank manager appreciates their work and tells JK and his friend that it would be very helpful if they could help clean homes regularly. He also suggests that about 150 other flats in his apartment complex would also appreciate this service. This becomes JK's first business venture. For this, he also ropes in help from his school friend Nithya (Nithya Menen). Together, JK, Nithya, and their friends go on to become very successful with multiple projects.

Later, the reason for change in JK's behavior is explained. When JK and friends were planning to go for the New Year Party, Ravi also wants to go with them and becomes a good friend of JK. Ravi comes from a very poor background, and his family is dependent on him. After the party, the gang meets with an accident, resulting in Ravi's death and a serious head injury for JK. JK has only a couple of years left in his life. This makes him realise the importance of life, and he decides to make his family happy and make sure that they have enough money before he dies. However, JK does not tell this to anyone but Nithya. In the end, JK leaves the responsibilities of business and his family to Nithya and goes off to the USA (where he would likely die because of his illness). Nithya is shown to be running the business and living with memories of time spent with her best friend JK.

Cast

Soundtrack 

The soundtrack features five songs composed by G. V. Prakash Kumar, with lyrics by Na. Muthukumar, Yugabharathi, Madhan Karky, Cheran. The album was released by Cheran's music company Dream Sounds Digital Solution on 15 September 2013. The film's score was composed by Siddharth Vipin who also composed three additional songs for the film. Milliblog wrote: "Cheran's last film as director – Pokkisham – had fantastic music from Sabesh Murali; the move to GV Prakash Kumar produces underwhelming results". Indiaglitz wrote: "Funky, rocking and melodious, the album has everything that the youth these days want to listen to. Predominantly duets and only one solo to speak of, the album will certainly be a popular favourite among all". Behindwoods wrote:"There are moments of classic GVP, but could have done with few more".
Tamil

Telugu

Marketing 
Sharwanand had dubbed for his character in Tamil. As part of the promotion Cheran initiated a project named JK Fest 2013, in which college students from Tamil Nadu could participate. Students were asked to visualise and use their creativity to enact the songs of JK Enum Nanbanin Vaazhkai without knowing the film's story. Cheran revealed that the film would be released on Internet, DVD and satellite, on the same day of its theatrical release. Cheran added that by releasing the film across all media on the same day, piracy could be curbed. However, the theatrical release did not happen; the film was instead released as a direct-to-video film on 6 March 2015, via Cheran's C2H (Cinema2Home) initiative. The film is also available on Amazon Prime Video.

The Telugu version, initially titled Yemito Ee Maya, was later retitled as Rajadhi Raja and released theatrically on 24 June 2016, with the makers attempting to profit from Sharwanand's resurgence at the Telugu box office. However, this version failed commercially.

Reception 
Baradwaj Rangan wrote for The Hindu, "JK Enum Nanbanin Vaazhkai feels like Cheran's attempt to show that he isn't, anymore, the sentimental, melodramatic filmmaker whose good intentions haven't always resulted in good movies (or good box-office collections). He's trying to show us that he can be young, hip. [...] JK Enum Nanbanin Vaazhkai may have worked if Cheran had stuck to his style". Regarding the Telugu version, a critic from The Hans India wrote that "Rajadhi Raja is a breezy feel good film with colorful visuals, enchanting score and well sketched characters.

References

External links 
 

2015 romantic drama films
2015 direct-to-video films
Films scored by G. V. Prakash Kumar
2015 films
Films directed by Cheran
Indian buddy films
Indian direct-to-video films
Indian romantic drama films
Indian multilingual films
2010s Tamil-language films
2010s buddy films
2015 multilingual films